Dr. Nina Mikhailovna Pavlova (1897–1973) was a Russian botanist, plant breeder, and children's literature author. As a botanist she is noted for developing cultivars of berry plants, including 24 new varieties of currant and gooseberry. As a children's literature author, she popularized scientific topics for children as fairy tales. She was a recipient of the Order of Lenin and the Order of the Badge of Honour.

References 

 1897 births
 1973 deaths
 Russian women scientists
Soviet botanists
 Russian children's writers
Russian women children's writers
Russian women botanists